The 1941 Penn Quakers football team was an American football team that represented the University of Pennsylvania in the Ivy League during the 1941 college football season. In its fourth season under head coach George Munger, the team compiled a 7–1 record, won the Ivy League championship, outscored opponents by a total of 180 to 55, and was ranked No. 15 in the final AP Poll. The team's lone setback was a 13–6 loss to Navy.

Back Gene Davis was selected by the Associated Press as a first-team player on the 1941 All-Eastern football team, and end Bernie Kuczynski was named to the second team. Other key players included halfback Bob Odell, fullback Bert Stiff, and Bob Brundage.

Munger was Penn's head coach for 16 years; he was inducted into the College Football Hall of Fame in 1976.

Schedule

References

Penn
Penn Quakers football seasons
Penn Quakers football